Nurkanat Azhikanov  (born 23 February 2001) is a Kazakhstani Professional karateka, he is currently represents Kazakhstan internationally Kumite (Karate) event.

Career
He won the silver medal in Junior individual Kumite male -76 kg in 16th Junior Asian Karate Championships in Kazakhstan in the year of 2017

He qualified at the World Olympic Qualification Tournament in Paris, France to represent Kazakhstan in Men’s -75 Kg Kumite Category  at the Karate competition of the 2020 Summer Olympics in Tokyo, Japan.

He won one of the bronze medals in his event at the 2021 Asian Karate Championships held in Almaty, Kazakhstan.

He competed in the men's kumite 75 kg event at the 2022 World Games held in Birmingham, United States. He competed at the 2021 Islamic Solidarity Games held in Konya, Turkey.

Records

References 

Living people
Place of birth missing (living people)
Kazakhstani male karateka
Karateka at the 2020 Summer Olympics
2001 births
Olympic karateka of Kazakhstan
21st-century Kazakhstani people
Competitors at the 2022 World Games
Islamic Solidarity Games competitors for Kazakhstan